Janet (Jenny) Armstrong (9 May 1903 - 20 November 1985) was a shepherd who became the focus of Scottish artist  Victoria Crowe's work.  After she retired she continued to keep a small flock, and this was when Victoria Crowe moved next door and they became friends.  Between 1970 and 1985 Crowe produced more than 50 paintings and drawings of Armstrong's retirement years, showing her journey through the final 15 years of life.  Crowe's paintings and drawings were put on view at an exhibition entitled 'A Shepherd's Life' at the Scottish National Portrait Gallery in 2000 which attracted more than 30,000 visitors.

Early life 
Janet (Jenny) Armstrong was born at the Farm of Fairliehope in Carlops on 9 May 1903 to Margaret (Maggie) Carruthers and Andrew Armstrong. Armstrong attended school at Nine Mile Burn, and started her farming career as a child, with her first lambing taking place at the age of nine.

Career 
By the time she was in her twenties, Armstrong was looking after a large hill herd in the Pentland Hills. She spent her entire career and life as a hill shepherd, working in bleak conditions.  She moved to the remote hamlet of Kittleyknowe in 1940s, living in Monk's Cottage and remained there for the rest of her life.

Retirement and death 
Armstrong retired in the 1970's and it was then that artist Victoria Crowe moved in next door.  They became friends and Crowe then began capturing Armstrong's life. 

Armstrong passed away on 20 November 1985.

References 

1903 births
1985 deaths